Miami Beach is an unincorporated community in Lower Township in Cape May County, New Jersey, United States.

Miami Beach is located on Delaware Bay, and is part of Villas.  A beach with the same name as the settlement is also located there.

The area was surveyed in the 1920s by the Miami Beach Builders Corporation of Philadelphia, who established the settlement there.

Education
As with other parts of Lower Township, it is served by Lower Township School District for primary grades and Lower Cape May Regional School District for secondary grades; the latter operates Lower Cape May Regional High School.

References

Lower Township, New Jersey
Unincorporated communities in Cape May County, New Jersey
Unincorporated communities in New Jersey